Spring Creek High School may refer to:

Spring Creek High School (Nevada)
Spring Creek High School (North Carolina), Seven Springs, North Carolina